The Italian Democratic Party (PDI) was an Italian right-wing political party founded in 1944.

History
The party was founded by the union of the following clubs and movements:
 Centre of Italian Democracy (Centro della Democrazia Italiana);
 Party of Union (Partito d'Unione);
 Social Democratic Party (Partito Sociale Democratico);
 Party of Democratic Union (Partito d'Unione Democratica);
 Movement of Democratic Renewal (Movimento di Rinnovazione Democratica);
 Italian Progressive Party (Partito Progressista Italiano).

In the 1946 general election, the PDI took part of the coalition named National Bloc of Freedom (Blocco Nazionale della Libertà - BNL).

After that, PDI dissolved and its members entered into the Italian Liberal Party and Monarchist National Party.

In 1959 Monarchist National Party and People's Monarchist Party merged into the Common Man's Front, the Italian Democratic Party of Monarchist Unity (named Italian Democratic Party until 1961).

Defunct political parties in Italy
Monarchist parties in Italy
Political parties established in 1944
1944 establishments in Italy